Round Island or île Ronde may refer to:

Australia 
 Round Island (Queensland), Frankland Islands
 Round Island (Tasmania), Hogan Group, northern Bass Strait

Canada 
 Round Island, Nova Scotia
 Round Island (Nunavut) (two: Coutts Inlet, Baffin Bay, and Cross Bay, Chesterfield Inlet; there is also a Round Rocks Island)
 Île Ronde (Îles Laval), in the Rivière des Prairies, Quebec

China 
 Robert Island (Paracel Islands), also known as Round Island, occupied by China (PRC) and also claimed by Taiwan (ROC) and Vietnam

France 
 île Ronde, Brest, in the roadstead of Brest

Hong Kong 
 Round Island or Pak Sha Chau (白沙洲), in North District
 Round Island, Hong Kong or Ngan Chau (銀洲), in Southern District

Mauritius 
 île Ronde, Mauritius, an islet on the coast of Mauritius
 Bolyeriidae, also known as the Round Island boas
 Round Island day gecko

Seychelles 
 Round Island, Mahé
 Round Island, Praslin

United Kingdom 
 Round Island (Dorset)
 Round Island, County Down, a townland in County Down, Northern Ireland
 Round Island, County Fermanagh, a townland in County Fermanagh, Northern Ireland
 Round Island, Isles of Scilly, the location of Round Island Light, Cornwall

United States 
 Round Island (Aleutian Islands), Alaska
 Round Island (Nanticoke River) in Maryland; see List of islands of Maryland
 Bumpkin Island, Massachusetts, also known as Round Island
 Round Island (Michigan)
 Round Island Light (Michigan), a lighthouse on the above island
 Round Island (Detroit River), a different island in southeast Michigan
 Round Island (Mississippi)
 Iona Island (New York), part of which is known as Round Island
 Round Island (Ohio), located within Buckeye Lake, Fairfield County

See also
 Ronde Island, Grenada
 List of islands by name (R)